Sergei Baranov may refer to:
 Sergei Baranov (figure skater) (born 1983), Ukrainian ice dancer
 Sergei Baranov (volleyball) (born 1981), Russian volleyball player